Lee Scroggins (born 23 October 1981) is an English footballer who played as a midfielder for South Shields.

Scroggins began his career with Darlington, but moved on to Northern Premier League Premier Division club Blyth Spartans in 2001 without having played for Darlington's first team. He spent just over a year with Spartans, before joining Whitley Bay of the Northern League for the remainder of the 2002–03 season. Scroggins then moved to the United States, where he had a successful college soccer career at Lynn University, graduating in Sports Recreation and Management. He played for Virginia Beach Mariners in the USL First Division in the 2006 season, but the club folded, and Scroggins returned to England, where he joined Northern League side South Shields.

References

External links
 Profile at South Shields F.C.
 Profile at USL Soccer

1981 births
Living people
Footballers from Darlington
English footballers
Association football midfielders
Darlington F.C. players
Blyth Spartans A.F.C. players
Whitley Bay F.C. players
South Shields F.C. (1974) players
Virginia Beach Mariners players
USL First Division players
Lynn Fighting Knights men's soccer players
English expatriate sportspeople in the United States
Expatriate soccer players in the United States
English expatriate footballers